Harazpey-ye Shomali Rural District is a rural district (dehestan) in Sorkhrud District, Mahmudabad County, Mazandaran Province, Iran. According to the 2006 census, its population totalled 16,343 according to data from 4,445 families. The rural district has 26 villages.

References 

Rural Districts of Mazandaran Province
Mahmudabad County